The Evolution of Textile Monument, is a monument located in the center of the city of Ksar Hellal (Tunisia). The monument is a symbol of the development of the textile industry in Ksar Hellal, the city is dubbed "the textile capital of Tunisia".

The monument was designed and executed by the Tunisian sculptor Abdelfattah Boussetta in 1997. The monument is also known by the name Hmmama which means ‘dove’ in English, due to the dove at the top of the monument, through which the sculptor wanted to represent the initial motion (development and ambition) and the creativity of the city in the textile industry sector.

Used materials: Copper, Bronze and Steel.

Gallery

References

External links 

Monuments and memorials in Tunisia